Blakeman is a surname. Notable people with the surname include:

 Adam Blakeman (1596–1665), English-born American preacher
 Adam Blakeman (footballer) (born 1991), English footballer
 Alec Blakeman (1936–1994), English footballer
 Bruce Blakeman, American politician
 Clete Blakeman (born 1964), American National Football League  official
 Helen Blakeman (born 1971), English playwright and screenwriter
 Jennifer Blakeman, American musician and music industry executive
 Laura Blakeman (born 1979), British slalom canoeist
 Laurie Blakeman (born 1958), Canadian politician

Fictional characters
 Natasha Blakeman, a character from the UK television ITV soap opera, Coronation Street

Other uses
 Blakeman, Kansas